Zibeline ( or ) is a thick, soft fabric with a long nap. It is usually made of wool, such as mohair or alpaca, but can also be made from the hair of other animals, such as camels.

Zibeline can also refer either to the sable (Martes zibellina) or to its pelt, which zibeline was originally made from.

Zibeline can also refer to a heavy silk fabric with a twill weave, very similar to Mikado.

References

External links

Pile fabrics